Gary Scott Feinerman (born February 19, 1965) is a former United States district judge of the United States District Court for the Northern District of Illinois.

Early life and education 

Feinerman earned a Bachelor of Arts in 1987 from Yale University. He graduated from Stanford Law School with a Juris Doctor in 1991, where he finished second in his class and was a member of Stanford Law Review and Order of the Coif. From 1991 until 1992, Feinerman worked as a law clerk to United States Court of Appeals for the Seventh Circuit Judge Joel Flaum. From 1992 until 1993, Feinerman worked as an associate in the Chicago law firm of Mayer Brown. From 1993 until 1994, Feinerman worked as a law clerk for U.S. Supreme Court Associate Justice Anthony Kennedy, alongside future justices Neil Gorsuch and Brett Kavanaugh.

Professional career 

From 1994 until 1996, Feinerman worked for the United States Department of Justice as Counsel to the Office of Policy Development and also on detail to the Office of the Counsel of the President in 1995. From 1996 until 1999, Feinerman again worked as an associate for the Chicago law firm Mayer, Brown, Rowe & Maw.  He served as a partner at the firm from 2000 until 2003. While at Mayer Brown, Feinerman performed pro bono work for the NAACP. From 2003 until 2007, Feinerman worked in the office of the Illinois Attorney General as the state's Solicitor General. On Nov. 5, 2003, Feinerman argued before the U.S. Supreme Court for petitioner in Illinois v. Lidster. The Court ultimately voted 6–3 for Illinois, holding that police departments may set up roadblocks to question motorists with no individual or collective suspicion of criminal activity, but rather to collect information about a recent hit-and-run accident. In 2007, Feinerman joined the Chicago law firm Sidley Austin as a partner, where he worked until becoming a United States District Judge.

Federal judicial service 

In 2009, Feinerman applied for a vacant federal judgeship in Chicago. In August 2009, Feinerman's name was one of seven that Senator Dick Durbin submitted to the White House. On February 24, 2010, President Obama formally nominated Feinerman for the vacancy created by Judge Robert William Gettleman, who assumed senior status in May 2009. On April 15, 2010, the United States Senate Committee on the Judiciary reported Feinerman's name to the full Senate. The full Senate voted 80–0 to confirm Feinerman on June 28, 2010, and he received his commission the next day. He resigned on December 31, 2022. Since his resignation, he went back to private practice as a partner in a law firm. 

In 2020, Feinerman vacated a policy implemented by the Trump administration that permitted immigration officials to deny green cards to applicants by creating a wealth test for individuals seeking permanent residency in the United States.

See also 
 List of law clerks of the Supreme Court of the United States (Seat 1)

References

External links 

1965 births
Living people
21st-century American judges
20th-century American Jews
Judges of the United States District Court for the Northern District of Illinois
Law clerks of the Supreme Court of the United States
People associated with Mayer Brown
People from Skokie, Illinois
Solicitors General of Illinois
Stanford Law School alumni
United States district court judges appointed by Barack Obama
Yale College alumni
21st-century American Jews